Metropolitan State University (Metro State) is a public university in the Minneapolis–St. Paul, Minnesota metropolitan area. It is a member of the Minnesota State Colleges and Universities system.

History

The institution was founded in 1971 as Minnesota Metropolitan State College with a mission to educate non-traditional students from the Twin Cities metropolitan area whose needs were not served by other existing institutions like the University of Minnesota. David E. Sweet was appointed the university's first president and the school, with offices above a drug store in downtown St. Paul, admitted the first class of 50 students in 1972.  The university did not have a campus and offered classes in rented space throughout the Twin Cities (Minneapolis-St. Paul) metropolitan area. When Metropolitan State began, it was a college for working adults. It was strictly an upper-division college where students could only complete their junior and senior years of academic study. The university initially followed a non-traditional course: it offered competence-based learning whereby students were recognized for learning gained outside the classroom—including prior learning through experience. Letter grades were available, but they were always optional. Instead of mandatory letter grades instructors wrote 'narrative evaluations' and recorded only what students "knew and could do." Students designed their own degree plans. Most of the teaching was done by 'community faculty' who held advanced degrees and had extensive practical experience in their respective fields.

During the 1980s, enrollment grew from around 1,000 students to over 2,500 students. The university expanded its programs to 30 baccalaureate programs as the state increased funding for the institution.

The university began admitting freshmen and sophomores and adopted general education requirements and a grading policy with grade point averages in 1994. In the Fall of 1998, Metro State along with all public higher education in Minnesota, moved from a three quarter to a two semester scheduling system. In 1992, the main campus of the university moved to a permanent campus that is located in the Dayton's Bluff section of east Saint Paul. Despite this change the university maintained a commitment to  offering classes in leased space throughout the metropolitan area. Today the main campus is located in Saint Paul, and additional campus facilities are located in Midway, Minneapolis and Brooklyn Park.

Although Metro State adopted a more traditional format in the 1990s, it continues to give students the opportunity to create their own individualized/self-designed degree programs through the  College of Individualized Studies (CIS). On July 1, 2012, Metro State's 'First College' was renamed the CIS. The individualized degrees are a popular alternative for students who are interested in unique or interdisciplinary degrees instead of traditional 'structured' degrees.

During the 2009–10 school year, Metro State enrolled 6,000 full-time equivalent students. From 2008 to June 30, 2014, Dr. Sue K. Hammersmith was Metro State's president. During Dr. Hammersmith's six-year tenure, the number of degrees conferred increased by 38%. Dr. Devinder Malhotra became Metro State's president on July 1, 2014. During the 2014–2015 school year, Metro State served 12,000 full and part-time students. Virginia Arthur was Metro State's provost from 2012 until 2016 when she became the university's president.

Presidents
 David E. Sweet       (1972–1977)
 Reatha King          (1977–1988)
 Charles Graham       (1988–1989)
 Tobin Barrozo        (1989–1992)
 Richard Green        (1993–1993)
 Susan Cole           (1993–1998)
 Dennis Nielsen       (1998–2000)
 Wilson G. Bradshaw   (2000–2007)
 William Lowe         (2007–2008)
 Sue Hammersmith      (2008–2014)
 Devinder Malhotra    (2014–2016)
 Virginia Arthur        (2016–present)

Academics
As part of its mission to educate working adults and non-traditional students, Metro State previously had an open admissions policy with rolling applications accepted throughout the year.  According to U.S. News & World Report's 2022 "Best Colleges" ranking guide, Metro State University is a 'national university' with a 56% acceptance rate.

Metro State offers 62 undergraduate degree programs, a self-designed B.A. degree in liberal arts, a self-designed/individualized B.A. degree, and three undergraduate certificates through its four colleges and three schools: the College of Arts and Sciences, the College of Management, the College of Health, Community and Professional Studies, the School of Nursing, the School of Law Enforcement and Criminal Justice, the School of Urban Education and the College of Individualized Studies.

Metropolitan State University offers 25 master's degree programs, an MA or MS degree in individualized studies, and an interdisciplinary Master of Arts degree in liberal studies. The university also offers eleven graduate certificate programs. In 2007, Metro State began offering an applied doctor of nursing practice degree. Metro State launched the first applied doctorate in business administration within the Minnesota State system during fall semester 2010. With nearly 900 declared accounting majors, Metropolitan State University's Bachelor of Science in Accounting program is the largest in Minnesota. Moreover, graduates of Metro State's accounting program consistently place among the top-10 finishers in Minnesota's exacting CPA examination. Altogether, Metro State offers a total of 108 undergraduate and graduate academic degrees and certificates—this does not include any undergraduate minor programs.

Accreditation 
The university is accredited by the Higher Learning Commission, the Accreditation Council for Business Schools and Programs (ACBSP), the Commission on Collegiate Nursing Education (CCNE) and the Council on Social Work Education (CSWE). Metro State is also accredited by the Minnesota Professional Educator Licensing and Standards Board (PELSB), theMinnesota Board of Peace Officer Standards and Training (POST), and the Society for Human Resource Management (SHRM). In addition, Metro State has received recognition and endorsements from the Institute of Management Accountants (IMA) and from the National Center of Academic Excellence in Cyber Defense Education.

Student demographics

Based on data from the 2016–2017 academic year, 45% of Metropolitan State University's student body were students of color, while 4% were from out-of-state and 2% were international. 42% of students were male and 58% were female. Metro State's students ranged in age from 15 to 84. Metro State's Class of 2015 had an 82% licensure exam pass rate. Metro State has a 67% six-year graduation rate.

Student accommodations
Metropolitan State University accommodates the needs of working adults by scheduling many of its classes in the evening and on weekends. The number of daytime course offerings have been increasing in recent years because of the growing demands of students. It is possible for recent graduates of Minneapolis and St. Paul public high schools to attend Metro State tuition free.

Library

In 2002, the Minnesota legislature approved funding for the construction of a library at the St. Paul campus; the building opened during spring semester 2004. The library also houses a branch of the Saint Paul Public Library. This is the only university/public library partnership in the state of Minnesota and one of only a few nationwide.

In order to encourage the spiritual development of students and members of the community, the library built the David Barton Community Labyrinth and Reflective Garden, named in honor of the library's first dean. The labyrinth is open to the public and has been the setting for several events.

Notable alumni
Metro State's first graduating class consisted of 12 people on February 1, 1973. As of May 7, 2022 - Metro State has 51,003 alumni. Notable alumni include:
 Derek Chauvin - former Minneapolis police officer and convicted murderer, known for his role in the murder of George Floyd.
 Carl Eller - former professional football player inducted into the Pro Football Hall of Fame
 Leo Foley - former Minnesota State Senator
 Frank J. Grass - United States Army General and Chief of the National Guard Bureau
 Ken Kelash - Minnesota state senator
 John Kriesel - former Minnesota state representative, former Minnesota National Guard Staff Sergeant, speaker, and author
 James Lukaszewski - author, consultant, founder, and president of the Lukaszewski Group Division of Risdall Public Relations
 Mohamud Noor - computer scientist, activist, and politician
 Sandy Pappas - former president of the Minnesota State Senate
 Samuel Sam-Sumana - honorable chief and former vice president of the Republic of Sierra Leone
 Char Samuelson - former Minnesota state representative
 Don Shelby - former news anchor on WCCO-TV

See also

 List of colleges and universities in Minnesota
 Higher education in Minnesota

References

External links 

 Official website

Educational institutions established in 1971
Minneapolis–Saint Paul
Public universities and colleges in Minnesota
Universities and colleges in Minneapolis
Universities and colleges in Saint Paul, Minnesota
1971 establishments in Minnesota
Universities and colleges accredited by the Higher Learning Commission